Clotworthy is a surname derived from Clotworthy near Wembworthy, Devon, England. The family inherited the manor of Rashleigh in Wembworthy in the 16th century. Sir Hugh Clotworthy (1569–1630) gained land in Ireland in the Plantation of Ulster and built Antrim Castle there. Clotworthy was used as a given name by his descendants.

Surname
 Bob Clotworthy (1931–2018), an American Olympic diver
 John Clotworthy, 1st Viscount Massereene (died 1665) an Anglo-Irish politician, son of Sir Hugh Clotworthy
 Pauline Clotworthy (1912–2004), an Irish teacher of fashion design
 Robert Clotworthy (born 1955), an American actor and voice actor
 Sarah Clotworthy Stevenson (1824–1885) First Lady of West Virginia, 1869-1871
 William Clotworthy (1926–2021), an American author and television censor

Given name
 Many Viscounts and Earls Massereene (surname Skeffington) descended from John Clotworthy, 1st Viscount Massereene
 Clotworthy Rowley, 1st Baron Langford (1763–1825), born Clotworthy Taylor, Irish politician
 Clotworthy Soden, an eighteenth century Irish Anglican priest
 Clotworthy Upton, 1st Baron Templetown (1721–1785), an Anglo-Irish courtier and peer

References